Andrei Prepeliță (born 24 July 1989) is a Moldovan professional footballer who plays as a defender for Moldovan club CSF Spartanii Selemet.

References

Living people
1989 births
Moldovan footballers
People from Ialoveni District
Association football defenders
FC Sfîntul Gheorghe players
FC Saxan players
Moldovan Super Liga players